El Triunfo (Spanish for The Triumph), formerly known as Boca de los Sapos (Frogs' cove), is a town located in Guayas, Ecuador, near the Cañar province. It is the seat of El Triunfo Canton, created in 1983.

As of the census of 2001, there are 34,117 people residing within canton limits. The area of the canton is 468.8 km², but some of it is disputed with La Troncal Canton in Cañar.

French priest Luis López Lescure helped the town grow. It is the most important town in eastern Guayas, as it grew around a road junction.

Populated places in Guayas Province